Two corps of the Union Army were called VII Corps during the American Civil War.

VII Corps (Department of Virginia)
This corps was established 22 July 1862 from various Union troops stationed in southeastern Virginia. The corps' main combat action occurred in the spring of 1863, when it faced Confederate troops of James Longstreet's Corps in Suffolk, Virginia.  Commanders were:

John Adams Dix 22 July 1862 – 16 July 1863
Henry Morris Naglee 16–20 July 1863
George W. Getty 20 July – 1 August 1863

The corps was discontinued on August 1, 1863, and its troops were transferred to the Eighteenth Corps.

VII Corps (Department of Arkansas)
After the original VII Corps was deactivated in the summer of 1863, a second VII Corps was formed from troops in the Department of Arkansas.  Most of its active service occurred during Steele's Arkansas Expedition.  Commanders were:

Frederick Steele 6 January 1864 – 22 December 1864
Joseph J. Reynolds 22 December 1864 – 1 August 1865

References
Citations

Bibliography
Boatner, Mark M. III, The Civil War Dictionary: Revised Edition, David McKay Company, Inc., 1984.

External links 
VII Corps (Department of Virginia) history
VII Corps (Department of Arkansas) history

07
Military units and formations established in 1862
1862 establishments in the United States
Military units and formations disestablished in 1865